Jörg Dittwar (born 1 August 1963) is a retired German football player.

Dittwar was born in Stadtsteinach, Bavaria.  In March 2009, he became the coach of the Germany national football team for people with intellectual disabilities.

References

External links
 

1963 births
Living people
People from Stadtsteinach
Sportspeople from Upper Franconia
German footballers
SpVgg Bayreuth players
1. FC Nürnberg players
Bundesliga players
2. Bundesliga players
Association football midfielders
Footballers from Bavaria